Marseilles is a city in LaSalle County, Illinois, United States. An Illinois River town, the population was 4,845 at the 2020 census, down from 5,094 at the 2010 census. It is part of the Ottawa, IL Micropolitan Statistical Area.

History

Lovell Kimball arrived at the area along the Illinois River known as the Grand Rapids in 1833 from Watertown, New York. Kimball, aware that the Illinois-Michigan Canal Bill had passed and the canal would eventually reach the rapids, hired a surveyor to lay out a town. Kimball called the town Marseilles in reference to the French city of Marseille as he hoped it would become a similar industrial center in Illinois. Marseilles, pronounced the same as the French city, was officially platted on June 3, 1835; the plat was revised twice for railroad and canal right-of-ways.

Nabisco Building
In 1921 the National Biscuit Company (Nabisco) built an eight-story corrugated cardboard box production plant in Marseilles, the largest industrial building in the state (outside of Chicago) at the time, and the first air-conditioned factory in the Midwest. Nabisco was a major employer in the area but ceased production at the plant in 2002.

Middle East Conflicts Wall Memorial
In 2004 the Middle East Conflicts Wall Memorial was dedicated to the service men and women who gave their lives fighting in US wars anywhere in the Middle East.  The Middle East Conflicts Wall Memorial is the first US memorial to servicemen dedicated while an actual war was ongoing.  Currently, the earliest names on the wall are from 1967 commemorating the deaths during the USS Liberty incident.

Andrew Bacevich, American 
historian, felt that all presidential candidates should visit Marseilles, commenting that "Just as there are all-but-mandatory venues in Iowa and New Hampshire where candidates are expected to appear, why not make Marseilles, Illinois, one as well. Let all of the candidates competing to oust Donald Trump from the White House (their ranks now approaching two dozen) schedule at least one campaign stop at the Middle East Conflicts Wall, press entourage suitably in tow."  Andrew Bacevich lost his son in Iraq, his son's name is included in the monument.

Museums 
In 2016, Marseilles resident Seattle Sutton founded a community museum, located in the Chicago, Rock Island and Pacific Railroad building.  Its collection includes historical items from the Nabisco factory, other Marseilles businesses, and archived recordings of Marseilles war veterans.

Geography
Marseilles is located at  (41.327795, −88.701121). The city is at the head of a rapids in the Illinois River historically known as "the Grand Rapids" or the "Rapids of Maninumba".

Demographics

As of the 2020 census there were 4,845 people, 1,937 households, and 1,327 families residing in the city. The racial makeup of the city was 88.3% White, 0.8% African American, 0.5% Native American, 0.5% Asian, 3.0% from other races, and 7.0% from two or more races. Hispanic or Latino of any race were 7.2% of the population.

There were 1,937 households, out of which 27.9% had children under the age of 18 living with them, 51.1% were married couples living together, 8.9% had a female householder with no husband present. 29.0% of all households were made up of individuals, and 11.4% had someone living alone who was 65 years of age or older. The average household size was 2.33 and the average family size was 2.90

The city's age distribution consisted of 25.5% under the age of 18, and 19.2% who were 65 years of age or older. The median age was 41.8 years, and for every 100 females there were 98.3 males.

The median income for a household in the city was $51,835, and the median income for a family was $69,537. The per capita income was $26,182. 16.0% of families and 20.3% of individuals were below the poverty line, including 32.1% of those under 18 and 7.3% of those over 65.

See also
William D. Boyce
William H. Stead
Chicago, Rock Island and Pacific Railroad Depot (Marseilles, Illinois)

References

External links 

 City of Marseilles, Illinois
 Marseilles Museum

Cities in Illinois
Ottawa, IL Micropolitan Statistical Area
Cities in LaSalle County, Illinois
Populated places established in 1835
1835 establishments in Illinois